Mould is a surname. Notable people with the surname include:

 Alex Mould, Ghanaian politician 
 Bob Mould (born 1960), American musician with alternative rock bands Hüsker Dü and Sugar
 Brooks K. Mould, American music publisher
 Billy Mould (1919-1999), English footballer
 Jacob Wrey Mould (1825-1886), English-born architect, illustrator, linguist and musician
 James Mould (politician) (1870–1944), politician in Alberta, Canada
 James Mould (lawyer) (1893–1958), English barrister
 Jeremy Mould (born 1949), Australian astronomer
 John Mould (1910-1957), Australian Navy officer and recipient of the George Cross
 Jon Mould (born 1991), Welsh racing cyclist
 Philip Mould (born 1960), English art dealer and historian
 Peter "Boy" Mould (1916-1941), British Royal Air Force Second World War flying ace
 Quita Mould, archaeologist
 Steve Mould, British science presenter

See also
 Betty Mould-Iddrisu, Ghanaian lawyer and politician
 Moulds (surname)

Surnames from given names